The 2019 Liga 1, also known as Shopee Liga 1 for sponsorship reasons, was the third season of Liga 1 under its current name and the 10th season of the top-flight Indonesian professional league for association football clubs since its establishment in 2008. The season started on 15 May 2019 and finished on 22 December 2019. Fixtures for the 2019 season were announced on 7 May 2019.

Persija were the defending champions. PSS, Semen Padang, and Kalteng Putra joined as the promoted teams from the 2018 Liga 2. They replace Mitra Kukar, Sriwijaya, and PSMS who were relegated to the 2019 Liga 2.

On 2 December 2019, Bali United won the championship for the first time in their history, becoming the seventh club to win the Liga 1 after second placed Borneo draw to PSM, followed by a win in Semen Padang, giving Bali United a 17-point lead with only four games left.

Teams
Eighteen teams competed in the league – the top fifteen teams from the previous season and the three teams promoted from the Liga 2. The new teams this season were PSS, Semen Padang, and Kalteng Putra, who replaced Mitra Kukar, Sriwijaya, and PSMS.

Name changes
 PS TIRA merged with Persikabo into TIRA-Persikabo and relocated to Cibinong.
 Perseru relocated to Bandar Lampung and were renamed to Badak Lampung.

Stadiums and locations

Notes:

Personnel and kits 
Note: Flags indicate national team as has been defined under FIFA eligibility rules. Players and coaches may hold more than one non-FIFA nationality.

Notes:

 On the front of shirt.
 On the back of shirt.
 On the sleeves.
 On the shorts.
Additionally, referee kits are made by Specs and Mitre supplied the match ball.

Apparel and captain changes:

Coaching changes
 

Notes:

Foreign players
Football Association of Indonesia restricted the number of foreign players to four per team, including one slot for a player from AFC countries. A team can use all four foreign players at once.
 Players name in bold indicates the player was registered during the mid-season transfer window.
 Former Player(s) were players that out of squad or left club within the season, after pre-season transfer window, or in the mid-season transfer window, and at least had one appearance.

Source: First transfer window, Second transfer window
Notes:

League table

Results

Season statistics

Top goalscorers

Hat-tricks

Discipline
Most yellow card(s): 11
  Akbar Tanjung (Badak Lampung)
  Muhammad Tahir (Persipura)
Most red card(s): 3
  Leonard Tupamahu (Bali United)

Attendances

Awards

See also
 2019 Liga 2
 2019 Liga 3
 2018–19 Piala Indonesia

Notes

References

External links
 

 
2019
Liga 1
1
Indonesia